The Panevėžio apygardos balsas (literally: Voice of Panevėžys county) was the weekly newspaper of the  in Panevėžys, which ran since August 1941 until May or June 1944. It was also the newspaper of Panevėžys county.

History 

Editors 

  ir Algirdas Jonas Kaulėnas – 1941–1942
 Jonas Vytautas Narbutas ir Jonas Mekas – 1943–1944. At this point in time, this was an underground newspaper.

References

Sources

External links 

 Issues of the newspaper Panevėžio apygardos balsas from 1941 to 1944.

Publications established in 1941
Publications disestablished in 1944
Defunct newspapers published in Lithuania
Lithuanian-language newspapers